Alexander McCormick Sturm (June 23, 1923 – November 16, 1951) was an American artist, author, and entrepreneur who co-founded in 1949 the American firearms maker Sturm, Ruger & Co. Sturm provided the start-up money and designed the Germanic heraldic eagle found on all Ruger guns. Sturm came from a prominent Connecticut family, and his wealthy mother was of the McCormick mercantile family. He was a Yale University graduate. Not long after the company had begun to succeed financially and gain traction, Sturm died from viral hepatitis.

Early life and education
Sturm was born in Westport, Connecticut, to sculptor, author and Yale football star Justin Sturm and Katherine "Kit" McCormick. He had one younger brother, Justin Jr., known as "Dusty". Kit's brother Alexander Agnew McCormick Jr. was a World War I officer and pilot. As a writer and artist, he was known for his two illustrated children's books—The Problem Fox, and From Ambush to Zig-zag—both published before he graduated from Yale; and for his lavish playboy lifestyle. A reviewer for The New York Times described The Problem Fox as "marvelous", and "a little masterpiece."

While a student at Yale, Sturm liked to dine at the best hotel in town, while other students would eat at the school dining hall. One of his classmates from his undergraduate days at Yale recalled:Although Sturm preferred to stay indoors, he was an accomplished polo player.

Co-founds Sturm, Ruger & Co.

He is perhaps best known today for his $50,000 seed-money investment in co-founding Sturm, Ruger & Co. in 1949 prompted by his interest in guns and his friendship with William Batterman Ruger. Ruger provided the technical know-how as a gunsmith, and business acumen; Sturm provided the Germanic heraldic-based red eagle logo and all of the financial backing necessary for starting the fledgling firearms business.

Ruger once stated,

Marriage
During World War II, Sturm was an officer with the Office of Strategic Services in Washington D.C. While in D.C., he met Paulina Longworth, the daughter of Alice Roosevelt Longworth.

Sturm and Longworth married in 1944, with his brother Dusty serving as best man. They had one daughter, Joanna Mercedes Alessandra Sturm, born in 1946. Longworth had helped launch Sturm, Ruger & Co., stuffing envelopes with Sturm on Sunday afternoons, and giving moral support to the two partners. The couple lived in Sturm's home in Westport, which was situated near his parents' house on property the family owned.

Death
Sturm became seriously ill in 1951 with viral hepatitis and died after a ten-day stay in the hospital. He was 28 years old. The Sturm, Ruger trademark, which had been a red eagle, was changed to a black eagle by his friend Bill Ruger to mourn the death of his business partner.

Sturm's wife died in January 1957, at the age of 31, from an overdose of sleeping pills. Their daughter was raised by Paulina's mother, Alice Roosevelt Longworth.

References

External links

1923 births
1951 deaths
People from Westport, Connecticut
Businesspeople from Connecticut
Writers from Connecticut
American manufacturing businesspeople
American children's writers
Bulloch family
Roosevelt family
20th-century American male writers
Deaths from hepatitis
McCormick family